Igino Rizzi (18 October 1924 – 9 December 2015) was an Italian ski jumper. He competed in the individual event at the 1948 Winter Olympics.

References

External links
 

1924 births
2015 deaths
Italian male ski jumpers
Olympic ski jumpers of Italy
Ski jumpers at the 1948 Winter Olympics
Sportspeople from the Province of Brescia